Deborah Coonts (born Deborah Buell) is an American novelist and lawyer best known for her Lucky O'Toole Las Vegas Adventures series of romantic, humorous mystery novels.

Early life and education
Coonts grew up in Dallas, Texas, where she attended the Hockaday preparatory school. She received a Bachelor of Business Administration degree from Southern Methodist University's Cox School of Business, and received a Master's degree in small business finance from the University of Texas at Austin's McCombs School of Business, a Master of Laws in taxation from New York University School of Law, and a Juris Doctor from Southern Methodist University's Dedman School of Law.

Career
Coonts was admitted to the Texas Bar Association in 1989 and practiced tax law in Colorado after being admitted to its bar in 1990.

While still practicing law, she wrote for Aviation for Women magazine from 1999 to 2005.

Her first book, Wanna Get Lucky?, was included in The New York Times "Notable Crime Books of 2010" and was a double finalist for the Romance Writers of America's 2011 RITA award in the categories of "Best First Book" and "Novel With Strong Romantic Elements." Lucky Bastard, fourth in the Lucky O'Toole series, was released by Forge Books in May 2013 and was a Denver Post bestseller in June 2013.

An essay by Coonts was included in the anthology Fade, Sag, Crumble: Ten Las Vegas Writers Confront Decay, published by CityLife Books in 2011.

In a 2012 interview with The Big Thrill magazine, Coonts said her debut series is based in Las Vegas because "the whole world wanders through Vegas. The stories are endless."

Personal life
Coonts is a licensed commercial pilot and instrument rated flight instructor in single-engine land and sea planes. She lived in Las Vegas and has one son. She is divorced from novelist Stephen Coonts.

Books

Fiction

Lucky O'Toole Las Vegas Adventures series
Wanna Get Lucky? (June 2015)
Lucky Stiff (July 2015)
So Damn Lucky (July 2015)
Lucky Bastard (July 2015)
Lucky Catch (June 2015)
Lucky Break (November 2015)
Lucky the Hard Way (November 2016)
Lucky Ride (June 2017)
Lucky Score (February 2018)
Lucky Ce Soir (February 2019)
Lucky Enough (May 2020)

Brinda Rose Humorous Mystery series
90 Days to Score (October 2020)

Kate Sawyer Medical Thriller series
After Me (December 2016)
Deadfall (November 2020)

Other Books
Deep Water (March 2017)
Crushed (February 2016)
The Housewife Assassin Gets Lucky (August 2018)
Lucky Double (April 2017)
The Lucky O’Toole Vegas Adventure Boxset 1 (March 2018)
The Lucky O’Toole Vegas Adventure Boxset 2 (March 2018)
The Complete Lucky O’Toole Novella Collection (January 2018) (ASIN B078TNN7D2)

Novellas
Lucky In Love (June 2015) (ASIN B00ZNGJ066)
Lucky Bang (June 2015) (ASIN B00ZNGJA48)
Lucky Now and Then (June 2015) (ASIN B00ZNGJDKY)
Lucky Flash (September 2015) (ASIN B014VCCRS0)

Non-fiction
Fade, Sag, Crumble: Ten Las Vegas Writers Confront Decay (contributor, 2011)

References

External links 
 Deborah Coonts' official site
 Publisher's author page
 Women in Aviation International - "A View From The Author's Table"

Living people
21st-century American novelists
Aviators from Texas
American romantic fiction writers
American women novelists
Writers from Dallas
Writers from Nevada
Lawyers from Dallas
Women romantic fiction writers
21st-century American women writers
Commercial aviators
Dedman School of Law alumni
Hockaday School alumni
Year of birth missing (living people)
American women commercial aviators
Southern Methodist University alumni
McCombs School of Business alumni
New York University School of Law alumni